Heudreville may refer to two communes in the Eure department in northern France:
 Heudreville-en-Lieuvin
 Heudreville-sur-Eure